Janel McCarville (born November 3, 1982) is an American professional basketball player from Custer, Wisconsin who is currently a WNBA free agent.

High school years

Born in Stevens Point, Wisconsin, McCarville attended Stevens Point Area Senior High (SPASH), where she led her school to a 59–11 record over her final three years.

As a senior, McCarville averaged 19.4 ppg and led her team to a runner-up finish in the 2001 Wisconsin Division I State Tournament. She had tournament averages of 21.7 ppg and 14.7 rpg. She shared the Wisconsin Player of the Year award with Mistie Williams (née Bass) and was honored as an AAU All-American and a member of the 2001 all-state first team.

College years
McCarville was a standout collegiate women's basketball player for the University of Minnesota (Twin Cities).

McCarville started all four years during her time with the Golden Gophers.

McCarville is in the all-time top five of every major statistical category for the Golden Gophers' women's team, including points, rebounds, assists, steals, and blocks. McCarville holds the NCAA record for most rebounds in the tournament, with 75 rebounds in five games. She also holds the NCAA record for tournament rebound average, with 15 per game.

Minnesota statistics

Source

WNBA career

In the 2005 WNBA Draft, McCarville was picked by Charlotte Sting as the No. 1 overall selection.
At Charlotte, she missed a number of games due to injury.  When she was able to play, her performance did not meet the expectations associated with the No. 1 draft pick.

In the spring of 2007, after the Sting folded, McCarville was claimed by New York in the WNBA dispersal draft. During the first half of the 2007 season she earned a place in the Liberty starting lineup, displacing rookie Jessica Davenport. On August 25, 2007, McCarville was named most improved player of the 2007 season.

McCarville continued to play for the Liberty in 2008. She was named WNBA Eastern Conference Player of the Week on two occasions during the 2008 season.

Janel decided to not report to training camp, and in accordance with WNBA rules, was suspended for the entire 2011 season. This became a point of division for the team's fan base.

On April 16, 2012, it was announced that McCarville intended to take the summer off from basketball in order to spend time with her family.

On March 1, 2013, the Minnesota Lynx acquired McCarville as part of a three team trade. McCarville filled the void left by the retirement of Taj McWilliams-Franklin, providing a veteran post presence. McCarville also rejoined Gopher teammate Lindsay Whalen, the starting point guard for the Lynx.

McCarville's play improved as the season went along. McCarville helped the team to its second title in three years, and her first as a pro, scoring 10 points in the decisive third game of the 2013 WNBA Finals.

On May 13, 2015, it was announced that McCarville would not be participating in the 2015 WNBA season, primarily due to back pain.

WNBA career statistics

Regular season

|-
| align="left" | 2005
| align="left" | Charlotte
| 28 || 3 || 11.1 || .340 || .000 || .640 || 2.7 || 0.4 || 0.4 || 0.3 || 0.8 || 1.8
|-
| align="left" | 2006
| align="left" | Charlotte
| 30 || 3 || 14.1 || .458 || .000 || .636 || 3.5 || 0.8 || 0.6 || 0.7 || 0.9 || 4.5
|-
| align="left" | 2007
| align="left" | New York
| 32 || 21 || 21.2 || .546 || .000 || .833 || 4.8 || 1.1 || 1.2 || 0.6 || 2.5 || 10.4
|-
| align="left" | 2008
| align="left" | New York
| 31 || 31 || 26.3 || .535 || .000 || .774 || 5.4 || 2.1 || 1.5 || 0.8 || 2.2 || 13.7
|-
| align="left" | 2009
| align="left" | New York
| 32 || 32 || 26.5 || .502 || .333 || .841 || 5.5 || 2.8 || 1.3 || 1.4 || 2.7 || 12.3
|-
| align="left" | 2010
| align="left" | New York
| 34 || 34 || 28.4 || .462 || .273 || .820 || 5.9 || 2.2 || 1.4 || 0.7 || 2.5 || 8.8
|-
|style="text-align:left;background:#afe6ba;"|  2013†
| align="left" | Minnesota
| 32 || 32 || 21.9 || .488 || .429 || .804 || 4.3 || 2.9 || 1.0 || 0.7 || 1.3 || 6.3
|-
| align="left" | 2014
| align="left" | Minnesota
| 34 || 34 || 27.1 || .457 || .333 || .738 || 4.8 || 3.1 || 1.2 || 0.9 || 1.7 || 7.0
|-
| align="left" | 2016
| align="left" | Minnesota
| 33 || 0 || 12.6 || .457 || .182 || .600 || 2.5 || 1.6 || 0.6 || 0.3 || 0.7 || 3.3
|-
| align="left" | Career
| align="left" | 9 years, 3 teams
| 286 || 190 || 21.3 || .491 || .278 || .774 || 4.4 || 1.9 || 1.0 || 0.7 || 1.7 || 7.7

Playoffs

|-
| align="left" | 2007
| align="left" | New York
| 3 || 3 || 32.7 || .415 || .000 || .571 || 5.7 || 3.3 || 2.7 || 1.3 || 3.0 || 14.0
|-
| align="left" | 2008
| align="left" | New York
| 6 || 6 || 27.5 || .493 || .000 || .565 || 5.2 || 1.3 || 1.0 || 1.5 || 3.2 || 13.8
|-
| align="left" | 2010
| align="left" | New York
| 2 || 2 || 31.5 || .300 || .000 || 1.000 || 9.0 || 4.0 || 1.5 || 1.0 || 3.0 || 5.0
|-
|style="text-align:left;background:#afe6ba;"|  2013†
| align="left" | Minnesota
| 7 || 7 || 24.7 || .486 || .500 || .625 || 5.0 || 3.4 || 1.1 || 1.1 || 2.4 || 5.7
|-
| align="left" | 2014
| align="left" | Minnesota
| 5 || 5 || 24.0 || .481 || .333 || .667 || 4.4 || 1.8 || 0.0 || 0.2 || 1.6 || 5.8
|-
| align="left" | 2016
| align="left" | Minnesota
| 4 || 0 || 4.8 || .400 || .000 || .000 || 1.0 || 0.3 || 0.0 || 0.0 || 0.3 || 1.0
|-
| align="left" | Career
| align="left" | 6 years, 2 teams
| 27 || 3 || 23.6 || .460 || .286 || .615 || 4.7 || 2.2 || 0.9 || 0.9 || 2.2 || 7.7

USA Basketball
McCarville was a member of the United States team that won a silver medal at the 2003 Pan American Games in Santo Domingo, Dominican Republic. McCarville averaged 4.3 points per game.

International career

During the 2006-2007 and 2007-2008 EuroLeague seasons, McCarville played for Good Angels Košice, Slovakia with former Charlotte Sting teammate Kelly Mazzante. In the fall of 2007, McCarville was named to the USA Select basketball team and helped that team take second place in the 2007 FIBA World League tournament. During the winter of 2009–2010, McCarville played for the Spartak Moscow Women's Basketball team. During the winters of 2010–2011 and 2011–2012, McCarville played for the Famila Schio Women's Basketball team. On September 12, 2012, The Canik Belediyesi basketball club was announced as having signed McCarville, as well as Detroit Shock veteran Cheryl Ford. McCarville Joined CCC Polkowice in 2013.  McCarville is From February 2014 to October 2015, McCarville played center on the Kayseri (Turkey) AGU Spor team in the Turkish women's premier basketball league (KBSL). From July 2014 to July 2015, she played for AIK Basket Solna in Sweden.

References

External links

WNBA Player Profile
Press Release of the 2005 WNBA Draft
2005 WNBA Draft Profile
USA Basketball profile
Fiba Profile

1982 births
Living people
All-American college women's basketball players
American expatriate basketball people in China
American expatriate basketball people in Italy
American expatriate basketball people in Russia
American expatriate basketball people in Slovakia
American expatriate basketball people in Sweden
American expatriate basketball people in Turkey
American women's basketball players
Basketball players at the 2003 Pan American Games
Basketball players from Wisconsin
Centers (basketball)
Charlotte Sting players
LGBT basketball players
LGBT people from Wisconsin
Lesbian sportswomen
Liaoning Flying Eagles players
Minnesota Golden Gophers women's basketball players
Minnesota Lynx players
New York Liberty players
Pan American Games medalists in basketball
Pan American Games silver medalists for the United States
People from Stevens Point, Wisconsin
People from Stockton, Wisconsin
Women's National Basketball Association first-overall draft picks
Medalists at the 2003 Pan American Games
United States women's national basketball team players